Vignevieille (Languedocien: Vinhavièlha) is a commune in the Aude department in southern France. Its inhabitants are called Vignevieillais.

Geography
The commune is located in the Corbières Massif.

The village lies on the right bank of the Orbieu, which flows northeast through the commune.

Population

Sights
 Ruins of the Château de Durfort
 Fountain built in 1897. The round basin is of pink marble from the Pic de Berles quarry situated in the communes of Vignevieille and Salza. At the centre is a column with the inscription: République Française, 1897, Jouve. The fountain runs permanently, even in drought.

See also
 Corbières AOC
 Communes of the Aude department

References

Communes of Aude